The 2013–14 San Mig Coffee Mixers season was the 26th season of the franchise in the Philippine Basketball Association (PBA).

Key dates
November 3: The 2013 PBA Draft took place in Midtown Atrium, Robinson Place Manila.
January 5: The Mixers defeated Barangay Ginebra San Miguel on a matchup that broke the record of the most people in the Mall of Asia Arena on a 79-83 victory, and an attendance of 20,600 people.
February 12: The Mixers defeated Barangay Ginebra San Miguel in game seven of the best-of-seven series in the Semifinals of the Philippine Cup, a matchup that broke the record of the most crowd attendance in a game itself on a 110-87 victory, with an attendance of 25,000 people.
February 26:The Mixers won their 11th Championship on the 2013-14 PBA Philippine Cup defeating Rain or Shine, 4 wins to 2.
March 16: The Mixers again defeated Barangay Ginebra San Miguel on a 90-80 showdown, the matchup tallied the highest crowd attendance on the 2014 Commissioner's Cup.
May 7: The Mixers won against the Air21 Express on a do-or-die matchup on the Game 5 of the 2014 Commissioner's Semifinals, and booking their third straight final appearance and fifth on the last seven conferences, it also tallies the sixth do or die game which the team survived since the 2013 Governors' Cup.
May 15: Coach Tim Cone won his 17th PBA Championship in a 100-91 showdown against the Talk 'N Text Tropang Texters, on the first three quarters, the Texter dominated the game, but the Mixers rallied back even the lead was even blown up to 17, they eventually won the game,  and the rest of the Mixers also won the franchise's 12th championship, it also tallies three straight championship of the team, and four championship in the last eight conferences, James Yap won his third Finals MVP award.
June 1: The Mixers defeated Barangay Ginebra San Miguel, 100-88, it also tallied the most attendance in this season's Governors' Cup.
June 3: Yancy de Ocampo and Val Acuña was traded to GlobalPort Batang Pier in exchange of Yousef Taha and Ronnie Matias.
June 17: The Mixers won against the San Miguel Beermen, tallying the eight-straight semi-final appearance of the franchise since the 2012 PBA Commissioner's Cup.
June 18: TV analyst and former PBA player Jason Webb is hired as assistant coach.
June 27: The Mixers won against the Talk 'N Text Tropang Texters  on their semi-final series, to tally their fourth straight final appearance and sixth in the last eight conferences, and surviving eight-straight on do-or-die games.
July 9: The Mixers became the fourth team in PBA history to win the coveted Grand Slam after they won the deciding Game 5 of Governors Cup Finals, 92-89 against Rain or Shine Elasto Painters. James Yap was named the Finals MVP as he scored 29 points on 12 of 18 shooting from the field. This was the Mixers' 9th straight win in do or die games they played. Tim Cone became the only coach in PBA history to win 2 Grand Slams on two different teams. With this Grand Slam, the Mixers also had four-peat run, their 13th PBA title overall, tying them with the fabled Crispa Redmanizers for 3rd place in all-time list.

Draft picks

Roster

Philippine Cup

Eliminations

Standings

Game log

Playoffs

Bracket

Commissioner's Cup

Eliminations

Standings

Game log

Playoffs

Bracket

Governors' Cup

Eliminations

Standings

Bracket

Game log

Transactions

Overview

Recruited imports

References

Magnolia Hotshots seasons
San Mig